The Lithuanian A Lyga 2000 was the 11th season of top-tier football in Lithuania. The season started on 25 March 2000 and ended on 4 November 2000. 10 teams participated with FBK Kaunas winning the championship.

League standings

Results

First half of season

Second half of season

Relegation play-off 

|}

References 

LFF Lyga seasons
1
Lith
Lith